Andrey Golubev and Aleksandr Nedovyesov were the defending champions but chose not to defend their title.

Ariel Behar and Gonzalo Escobar won the title after defeating Robert Galloway and Nathaniel Lammons 4–6, 6–3, [10–7] in the final.

Seeds

Draw

References

External links
 Main draw

Amex-Istanbul Challenger - Doubles
2020 Doubles